Savea Sano Malifa OM (also known as Fata Sano Malifa) is a Samoan poet, journalist, newspaper editor, and publisher. He is the founder and editor-in-chief of the Samoa Observer, the main newspaper in Samoa. He is the author of the novel Alms for Oblivion. The Pacific Islands News Association awarded him the Pacific Freedom of Information award for defending the right of the Samoan people to freedom of information and expression. In 1998, he received the Commonwealth Press Union's Astor Award and Index on Censorship's Press Freedom Award.

Savea, an outspoken critic of former Prime Minister Tofilau Eti Alesana and his government, lost a civil claim over a story alleging the use of public funds to upgrade a hotel owned by Tofilau's children for a visit by Prince Edward, Earl of Wessex. The Samoa Observer was ordered to pay $WS  in court costs to Tofilau and $ damages for defamation.

Appeal to remove media restrictions
During the 2004 World Press Freedom Day awards, along with veteran reporter Autagavaia Tipi Autagavaia, Malifa made appeals to the government to remove restrictions; they urged Prime Minister Tuilaepa Aiono Sailele Malielegaoi and Deputy Prime Minister Misa Telefoni to remove the Printing and Publishing Act, to try to force news media to reveal their sources of information and remove the criminal libel laws, which Autagavaia had described as a relic of the past.

Recognition
In 2000, Malifa was named as one of the International Press Institute's 50 World Press Freedom Heroes of the past 50 years.

Malifa was appointed to the Order of Merit of Samoa in the 2014 Samoa Honours and Awards.

References

External links
International Press Institute
Pacific Media Watch
Fiji Daily Post, 3 November 1998
Pacific Media Watch
Police Report of Interrogation of Eletise Leafa Vitale

Living people
Samoan journalists
Samoan writers
Year of birth missing (living people)
Members of the Order of Merit of Samoa